Cantrellius is a genus of bristle flies in the family Tachinidae. There is one described species C. splendidus.

References

Dexiinae
Diptera of Australasia
Monotypic Brachycera genera
Tachinidae genera